John Benton may refer to:

Sergeant Benton, a fictional character in the British science fiction television series Doctor Who, played by John Levene
John Benton (curler) (born 1969), American curler
John Benton (footballer) (1865–1932), English footballer who played for Wolverhampton Wanderers
John F. Benton (1931–1988), professor of history at the California Institute of Technology
John Benton (American football), American football coach